Carolyn Scott is an American art director and set decorator. She won an Academy Award in the category Best Art Direction for the film The Madness of King George.

Selected filmography
 The Madness of King George (1994)
 Back to School with Franklin (2003)

References

External links

Living people
American art directors
American set decorators
Place of birth missing (living people)
Year of birth missing (living people)
Best Art Direction Academy Award winners